The Goldfield Hills is a mountain range in Esmeralda County, Nevada, south of the mining district and town of Goldfield, in the Great Basin.

References 

Mountain ranges of Nevada
Mountain ranges of Esmeralda County, Nevada
Mountain ranges of the Great Basin